The Bushoong languages are a clade of Bantu languages coded Zone C.80 in Guthrie's classification. According to Nurse & Philippson (2003), apart from Dengese and the Shuwa "dialect" of Bushoong, the languages form a valid node. They are:
 Hendo (Songomeno)
 Bushoong
 Lele 
 Wongo

Footnotes

References